In mathematics, specifically in order theory and functional analysis, an element  of a vector lattice  is called a weak order unit in  if  and also for all

Examples 

 If  is a separable Fréchet topological vector lattice then the set of weak order units is dense in the positive cone of

See also

Citations

References

  
  

Functional analysis